Kanina is a municipality and village in Mělník District in the Central Bohemian Region of the Czech Republic. It has about 90 inhabitants.

History
The first written mention of Kanina is from 1207.

References

Villages in Mělník District